Baharabad is a village and municipality in the Beylagan Rayon of Azerbaijan. It has a population of 741.

References

Populated places in Beylagan District